FirstOntario Concert Hall is a music and performing arts venue in downtown Hamilton, Ontario, Canada. The venue was originally known as Hamilton Place, and in 1998, became known as the Ronald V. Joyce Centre for the Performing Arts at Hamilton Place after receiving a donation from the Joyce Family Foundation. In 2016 FirstOntario Credit Union made a $2.5 million deal for the naming rights.

The venue is the permanent home of the Hamilton Philharmonic Orchestra and Opera Hamilton.

Description
There are 2 theatres located within FirstOntario Concert Hall. The main theatre (known as the Great Hall) features 2 suspended balconies and has a seating capacity of 2,193. The stage is 37.35 m wide, and has an adjustable depth from 11.4 m to 16.2 m. The Great Hall is recognized internationally for its outstanding acoustics. The smaller theatre is known as The Studio (formerly The Studio at Hamilton Place) and can accommodate up to 350 people. The venue also features rehearsal, break, and dressing rooms, as well as a private courtyard and a large loading dock that is shared with the Hamilton Convention Centre and the Ellen Fairclough Building. FirstOntario Concert Hall is directly connected to the Hamilton Convention Centre via the theatre's main lobby, and shares a common outdoor plaza and sculpture court with the Convention Centre and the Art Gallery of Hamilton known as Commonwealth Square, located above Summers Lane, and accessible via the theatre's mezzanine.

Performances
FirstOntario Concert Hall has hosted musicians and performing artists including Tony Bennett, Leonard Cohen, Morrissey, Chris de Burgh, Sarah McLachlan, Sharon, Lois & Bram Tangerine Dream, The Proclaimers and The Tragically Hip. Comedians Billy Connolly, Margaret Cho and Norm Macdonald have performed at the venue, as well as classic rockers Heart. Theatrical runs have included performances of A Chorus Line, Evita and The Color Purple, in addition to dance-based shows such as Moulin Rouge: The Ballet and Michael Flatley's Lord of the Dance.

In 1983 both the live concert video Chris de Burgh The Video and the stand-up comedy film Bill Cosby: Himself were recorded at the Hamilton Place Concert Hall.

Images

See also
 Hamilton Convention Centre
 Ellen Fairclough Building
 Art Gallery of Hamilton
 FirstOntario Centre
 Sheraton Hamilton
 Lloyd D. Jackson Square
 List of tallest buildings in Hamilton, Ontario

References

External links 
 

Culture of Hamilton, Ontario
Tourist attractions in Hamilton, Ontario
Buildings and structures in Hamilton, Ontario
Theatres in Ontario
1973 establishments in Ontario
Concert halls in Canada
Music venues completed in 1973
Theatres completed in 1973